Robert Spencer Evans (24 September 1911 – 1981) was a Welsh footballer who played as a half-back for Rhyl Athletic, Wrexham, Chester, Stoke City, Altrincham, Port Vale, and Northwich Victoria before World War II.

Career
Spencer played for Rhyl Athletic (over two spells), Wrexham, Chester, Stoke City (without making a first team appearance) and Altrincham, before joining Port Vale in July 1936. He featured in 34 Third Division North games in both the 1936–37 and 1937–38 seasons. Having fallen out of favour at The Old Recreation Ground, he was given a free transfer to Northwich Victoria in May 1938. He played at Mossley for one season at the end of his career in 1953, scoring nine goals in 23 appearances.

Career statistics
Source:

References

1911 births
1981 deaths
Sportspeople from St Asaph
Welsh footballers
Association football defenders
Association football wing halves
Association football inside forwards
Wrexham A.F.C. players
Rhyl F.C. players
Chester City F.C. players
Stoke City F.C. players
Altrincham F.C. players
Port Vale F.C. players
Northwich Victoria F.C. players
Mossley A.F.C. players
English Football League players